The Rabiosa, also called the Rabiusa or, on in the municipality of Malix, the Landwasser (Alemannic), is a 7.9-kilometre-long, left-hand tributary of the Plessur in the Swiss Canton of Grisons.

References

External links 

Rivers of Graubünden
1Rabiosa
Rivers of Switzerland